Glycogen storage disease type IV (GSD IV), or Andersen's Disease, is a form of glycogen storage disease, which is caused by an inborn error of metabolism. It is the result of a mutation in the GBE1 gene, which causes a defect in the glycogen branching enzyme. Therefore, glycogen is not made properly and abnormal glycogen molecules accumulate in cells; most severely in cardiac and muscle cells. The severity of this disease varies on the amount of enzyme produced. GSD IV is autosomal recessive, which means each parent has a mutant copy of the gene, but show no symptoms of the disease. Having an autosomal recessive inheritance pattern, males and females are equally likely to be affected by Andersen's disease. Classic Andersen's disease typically becomes apparent during the first few months after the patient is born. Approximately 1 in 20,000 to 25,000 newborns have a glycogen storage disease. Andersen's disease affects 1 in 800,000 individuals worldwide, with 3% of all GSDs being type IV. The disease was described and studied first by Dorothy Hansine Andersen.

Human pathology
It is a result of the absence of the glycogen branching enzyme, which is critical in the production of glycogen. This leads to very long unbranched glucose chains being stored in glycogen. The long unbranched molecules have low solubility, leading to glycogen precipitation in the liver. These deposits subsequently build up in the body tissue, especially the heart and liver. The inability to break down glycogen in muscle cells causes muscle weakness. The probable result is cirrhosis and death within five years. In adults, the activity of the enzyme is higher and symptoms do not appear until later in life.

Variant types

Fatal perinatal neuromuscular type
 Excess fluid builds up around and in the body of the fetus
 Fetuses exhibit fetal akinesia deformation sequence
 Causes decrease in fetal movement and stiffness of joints after birth
 Infants have low muscle tone and muscle wasting
 Do not survive past the newborn stage due to weakened heart and lungs

Congenital muscular type
 Develops in early infancy
 Babies have dilated cardiomyopathy, preventing the heart from pumping efficiently
 Only survive a few months

Progressive hepatic type
 Infants have difficulty gaining weight
 Develop enlarged liver and cirrhosis that is irreversible
 High BP in hepatic portal vein and buildup of fluid in the abdominal cavity
 Die of liver failure in early childhood

Non-progressive hepatic type
 Same as progressive, but liver disease is not so severe
 Do not usually develop cirrhosis
 Usually show muscle weakness and hypotonia
 Survive into adulthood
 Life expectancy varies upon symptom severity

Childhood neuromuscular type
 Develops in late childhood
 Has myopathy and dilated cardiomyopathy
 Varies greatly
 Some have mild muscle weakness
 Some have severe cardiomyopathy and die in early adulthood

Diagnosis
An assay of amylo-1,4 → 1,6 glucan transferases (which removes a block of 6 glucose residues from the 1,4 position and attaches it to the 1,6 position of the same chain)

Alternative names and related disease
Alternative names in medical literature for the disease include:
 Andersen's triad
 Glycogenosis type IV
 Glycogen branching enzyme deficiency
 Polyglucosan body disease
 Amylopectinosis

Mutations in GBE1 can also cause a milder disease in adults that is called adult polyglucosan body disease.

In other mammals
The form in horses is known as glycogen branching enzyme deficiency. It has been reported in American Quarter Horses and related breeds.

The disease has been reported in the Norwegian Forest Cat, where it causes skeletal muscle, heart, and CNS degeneration in animals greater than five months old. It has not been associated with cirrhosis or liver failure.

References

External links
 

Inborn errors of carbohydrate metabolism
Hepatology